Ville-Matti Koponen (born January 4, 1984 in Lahti) is a Finnish professional ice hockey forward currently playing for Kiekko-Laser of the Mestis.

He started his career in Pelicans and played with the team until 2007.

External links 
 

1984 births
Living people
Sportspeople from Lahti
Finnish ice hockey centres
Lahti Pelicans players
KooKoo players
TuTo players